Rupert Simeon Graves (born 30 June 1963) is an English film, television, and theatre actor. He is known for his roles in A Room with a View, Maurice, The Madness of King George and The Forsyte Saga. From 2010 to 2017 he starred as DI Lestrade in the BBC television series Sherlock.

Early life
Graves was born in Weston-super-Mare in Somerset, England, to Mary Lousilla (née Roberts) Graves, a travel co-ordinator, and Richard Harding Graves, a music teacher and musician.

Education
Graves was educated at Wyvern Community School, a state comprehensive school in his home town of Weston-super-Mare, which he left at the age of 16.

Career
Graves's first job after leaving school was as a circus clown. He has appeared in more than 25 films and more than 35 television productions. He has also appeared on stage.

He first came to prominence in costume-drama adaptations of E. M. Forster's novels A Room with a View (1985) and Maurice (1987), before appearing in films including A Handful of Dust (1988), The Madness of King George (1994), Different for Girls (1996), and Intimate Relations (1996).

His role in Intimate Relations won him the Best Actor award at the 1996 Montreal World Film Festival.  He was also acclaimed for his portrayal of Young Jolyon Forsyte in the television miniseries The Forsyte Saga (2002).

Personal life
In 1987, in his hometown of Weston-super-Mare, Graves met Yvonne, a stained glass artist (later a trained gardener) in a café. They lived together in Stoke Newington, London, and he helped her raise her two daughters, who were 10 and 14 years old when the relationship began. The couple were together for 13 years.

In September 2000, shortly after Graves's relationship with Yvonne ended, he met Australian-born production co-ordinator Suzanne Lewis at the opening-night party for The Caretaker, a play he was appearing in with Michael Gambon. They are married and have five children together.

Filmography

Film

Television

Theatre
In addition to his screen work, Graves has won acclaim for his stage acting, including roles in Broadway productions, in New York City, of the plays Closer (2000) and The Elephant Man (2002).

His notable London theatre credits include his performance as Presley Stray in the original production of Philip Ridley's The Pitchfork Disney (1991) at the Bush Theatre, west London, which won him Best Actor at the 1991 Charrington London Fringe Awards; in Martin Sherman's A Madhouse in Goa (1989) opposite Vanessa Redgrave; and as Eddie in the Peter Hall Company's production of David Rabe's Hurlyburly (1997–98) at the Old Vic and Queen's Theatre, for which he was nominated for the 1998 Laurence Olivier Award for Best Actor.

 and primary archive sources.

References

External links

Living people
1963 births
20th-century English male actors
21st-century English male actors
English male film actors
English male stage actors
English male television actors
English male voice actors
People from Weston-super-Mare
Male actors from Somerset
Theatre World Award winners